Cycles is the tenth studio album by American rock band The Doobie Brothers. The album was released on May 17, 1989, by Capitol Records.

It marked the band's reunion after breaking up in 1982. Instead of the later configurations with Michael McDonald at the helm, the band reverted to their 1972-4 lineup although Bobby LaKind who had played percussion with later configurations also rejoined. Tom Johnston, John Hartman and Michael Hossack returned to the lineup for the first time since 1977, 1979 and 1974 respectively.

The album was largely co-written with producers and sidesmen. Bobby LaKind collaborated with former Doobie members John McFee and Keith Knudsen on "Time is Here and Gone" and Michael McDonald on "Tonight I'm Coming Through (The Border)". Two cover versions were included in the form of the Four Tops' "One Chain (Don't Make No Prison)" and the Isley Brothers' "Need a Little Taste of Love."

The title of the album was taken from an unused song written by Tiran Porter. Porter later recorded the song for his 1995 solo album Playing To An Empty House.

Lead track "The Doctor" was released as a single and stormed to No. 9 on Billboard's Hot 100 and No. 1 on the Mainstream Rock Chart. After this album, Bobby Lakind retired from the band because of terminal colorectal cancer, which claimed his life in 1992.

The album was reissued in 2002 by One Way Records with two bonus tracks. The first was "Anything for Love", written by Bobby LaKind with Eddie Schwartz and Zeke Zirngiebel, which originally appeared on a CD single of "The Doctor". The second was an extended remix of "Need A Little Taste of Love," which had appeared on a CD single of "One Chain".

Track listing

Personnel
The Doobie Brothers
Tom Johnston – guitar, vocals (lead vocals on 1, 2, 4–6, 8, 9)
Patrick Simmons – guitar, vocals (lead vocals on 3, 7, 10)
Tiran Porter – bass, backing vocals
John Hartman – drums, backing vocals
Michael Hossack – drums, percussion
Bobby LaKind – percussion, backing vocals

Additional personnel
Bill Payne – keyboards
Dave Tyson – keyboards
Kim Bullard – keyboards
Dale Ockerman – keyboards
Phil Aaberg – keyboards
Don Frank – electronic drums
The Memphis Horns – horns
Wayne Jackson
Andrew Love
Rem Smiers – keytar
Shannon Eigsti – keyboards (3) (uncredited)

Production
Producers: Eddie Schwartz, Charlie Midnight, Rodney Mills
Production Assistant: Rodney Mills
Engineers: Tom Sadzeck, Devon Bernadoni, Jim Gaines, Rodney Mills, Jeffrey Norman
Mastering: Bob Ludwig
Remixing: Brian Wayy
Programming: Brian Wayy
Conductor: Bobby LaKind
Design: Jeffery Fey
Cover Photo: Tom Keller
Logo Design: Tom Nikosey
Art Direction: Tommy Steele

Charts

Weekly charts

Year-end charts

Notes

References

1989 albums
The Doobie Brothers albums
Albums produced by Rodney Mills
Capitol Records albums